According to proponents of the concept, sexual addiction, also known as sex addiction, is a state characterized by compulsive participation or engagement in sexual activity, particularly sexual intercourse, despite negative consequences.  The concept is contentious; neither of the two major mainstream medical categorization systems recognise sex addiction as a real medical condition, instead categorizing such behavior under labels such as compulsive sexual behavior.

The concept of sexual addiction is contentious. There is considerable debate among psychiatrists, psychologists, sexologists, and other specialists whether compulsive sexual behavior constitutes an addiction, and therefore its classification and possible diagnosis. Animal research has established that compulsive sexual behavior arises from the same transcriptional and epigenetic mechanisms that mediate drug addiction in laboratory animals; however,  sexual addiction is not a clinical diagnosis in either the DSM or ICD medical classifications of diseases and medical disorders. Some argue that applying such concepts to normal behaviors such as sex can be problematic, and suggest that applying medical models such as addiction to human sexuality can serve to pathologise normal behavior and cause harm.

Classification

None of the official diagnostic classification frameworks list "sexual addiction" as a distinct disorder.

Proponents of a diagnostic model for sexual addiction consider it to be one of several sex-related disorders within hypersexual disorder.  The term sexual dependence is also used to refer to people who report being unable to control their sexual urges, behaviors, or thoughts. Related or synonymous models of pathological sexual behavior include hypersexuality (nymphomania and satyriasis), erotomania, Don Juanism, and paraphilia-related disorders.

The ICD-11 created a new condition classification, compulsive sexual behavior disorder, to cover "a persistent pattern of failure to control intense, repetitive sexual impulses or urges resulting in repetitive sexual behaviour". However, CSBD is not considered to be an addiction, and the WHO does not support a diagnosis of sex addiction.

DSM
The American Psychiatric Association (APA) publishes and periodically updates the Diagnostic and Statistical Manual of Mental Disorders (DSM), a widely recognized compendium of mental health diagnostics.

The version published in 1987 (DSM-III-R), referred to "distress about a pattern of repeated sexual conquests or other forms of nonparaphilic sexual addiction, involving a succession of people who exist only as things to be used." The reference to sexual addiction was subsequently removed. The DSM-IV-TR, published in 2000 (DSM-IV-TR), did not include sexual addiction as a mental disorder.

Some authors suggested that sexual addiction should be re-introduced into the DSM system; however, sexual addiction was rejected for inclusion in the DSM-5, which was published in 2013. Darrel Regier, vice-chair of the DSM-5 task force, said that "[A]lthough 'hypersexuality' is a proposed new addition...[the phenomenon] was not at the point where we were ready to call it an addiction." According to the APA, the proposed diagnosis was not included due to a lack of research into diagnostic criteria for compulsive sexual behavior.

DSM-5-TR, published in March 2022, does not recognize a diagnosis of sexual addiction.

ICD
The World Health Organization produces the International Classification of Diseases (ICD), which is not limited to mental disorders. The most recent approved version of that document, ICD-10, includes "excessive sexual drive" as a diagnosis (code F52.7), subdividing it into satyriasis (for males) and nymphomania (for females). However, the ICD categorizes these diagnoses as compulsive behaviors or impulse control disorders and not addiction. The most recent version of that document, ICD-11, includes "compulsive sexual behavior disorder" as a diagnosis (code 6C72) – however, it does not use the addiction model.

CCMD
The Chinese Society of Psychiatry produces the Chinese Classification of Mental Disorders (CCMD), which is currently in its third edition the CCMD-3 does not include sexual addiction as a diagnosis.

Other
Some mental health providers have proposed various, but similar, criteria for diagnosing sexual addiction, including Patrick Carnes, Aviel Goodman, and the late Jonathan Marsh. Carnes authored the first clinical book about sex addiction in 1983, based on his own empirical research. His diagnostic model is still largely utilized by the thousands of certified sex addiction therapists (CSATs) trained by the organization he founded. No diagnostic proposal for sex addiction has been adopted into any official medical diagnostic manual, however.

During the update of the Diagnostic and Statistical Manual to version 5 (DSM-5), the APA rejected two independent proposals for inclusion.

In 2011, the American Society of Addiction Medicine (ASAM), the largest medical consensus of physicians dedicated to treating and preventing addiction, redefined addiction as a chronic brain disorder, which for the first time broadened the definition of addiction from substances to include addictive behaviors and reward-seeking, such as gambling and sex.

Borderline personality disorder

The ICD, DSM and CCMD list promiscuity as a prevalent and problematic symptom for Borderline Personality Disorder. Individuals with this diagnosis sometimes engage in sexual behaviors that can appear out of control, distressing the individual or attracting negative reactions from others. There is therefore a risk that a person presenting with sex addiction, may in fact have Borderline Personality Disorder. This may lead to inappropriate or incomplete treatment.

Medical reviews and position statements
In November 2016, the American Association of Sexuality Educators, Counselors and Therapists (AASECT), the official body for sex and relationship therapy in the United States, issued a position statement on sex addiction declaring that their organization "does not find sufficient empirical evidence to support the classification of sex addiction or porn addiction as a mental health disorder, and does not find the sexual addiction training and treatment methods and educational pedagogies to be adequately informed by accurate human sexuality knowledge. Therefore, it is the position of AASECT that linking problems related to sexual urges, thoughts or behaviors to a porn/sexual addiction process cannot be advanced by AASECT as a standard of practice for sexuality education delivery, counseling or therapy."

In 2017, three new USA sexual health organizations found no support for the idea that sex or adult films were addictive in their position statement.

On 16 November 2017 the Association for the Treatment of Sexual Abusers (ATSA) published a position against sending sex offenders to sex addiction treatment facilities. Those centers argued that "illegal" behaviors were symptoms of sex addiction, which ATSA challenged they had no scientific evidence to support.

Neuroscientists who are sex researchers state sex is not addictive. Addiction criteria were not met for sexual behaviours: “experimental studies do not support key elements of addiction such as escalation of use, difficulty regulating urges, negative effects, reward deficiency syndrome, withdrawal syndrome with cessation, tolerance, or enhanced late positive potentials.” Аs well as evidence of a key neurobiological feature of addiction is scarce in case of sex. 

Yet, despite these advances, research related to sexual addiction remains in its infancy. A lack of theoretical integration, deficits in methodological rigor, a paucity of clinical samples, over reliance on convenience samples (i.e., university students or Mechanical Turk samples), the complete absence of epidemiological studies, widespread inconsistencies in the definitions and measurements of CSB, and a lack of treatment studies all still plague the literature related to sexual addiction. If scientists, researchers, and clinicians in this domain want to bring the field forward and provide evidence-based care to people who report out-of control sexual behaviors, all of the above are needed. (Grubbs et al. 2020)

Diagnosis

ICD-11
The Compulsive Sexual Behavior Disorder is determined by following criteria:
 Persistent pattern of failure to control intense, repetitive sexual impulses or urges resulting in repetitive sexual behaviour
 The pattern of failure to control intense, sexual impulses or urges and resulting repetitive sexual behaviour is manifested over an extended period of time (6 months or more)
 Causes marked distress or significant impairment in personal, family, social, educational, occupational, or other important areas of functioning
 Distress that is entirely related to moral judgments and disapproval about sexual impulses, urges, or behaviours is not sufficient to meet this requirement

ICD-11 added pornography to CSBD. CSBD is not an addiction and should not be conflated with sex addiction.

Possible mechanisms

Animal research involving rats that exhibit compulsive sexual behavior has identified that this behavior is mediated through the same molecular mechanisms in the brain that mediate drug addiction. Sexual activity is an intrinsic reward that has been shown to act as a positive reinforcer, strongly activate the reward system, and induce the accumulation of ΔFosB in part of the striatum (specifically, the nucleus accumbens). Chronic and excessive activation of certain pathways within the reward system and the accumulation of ΔFosB in a specific group of neurons within the nucleus accumbens has been directly implicated in the development of the compulsive behavior that characterizes addiction.

In humans, a dopamine dysregulation syndrome, characterized by drug-induced compulsive engagement in sexual activity or gambling, has also been observed in some individuals taking dopaminergic medications.
Current experimental models of addiction to natural rewards and drug reward demonstrate common alterations in gene expression in the mesocorticolimbic projection. ΔFosB is the most significant gene transcription factor involved in addiction, since its viral or genetic overexpression in the nucleus accumbens is necessary and sufficient for most of the neural adaptations and plasticity that occur; it has been implicated in addictions to alcohol, cannabinoids, cocaine, nicotine, opioids, phenylcyclidine, and substituted amphetamines.  ΔJunD is the transcription factor which directly opposes ΔFosB. Increases in nucleus accumbens ΔJunD expression can reduce or, with a large increase, even block most of the neural alterations seen in chronic drug abuse (i.e., the alterations mediated by ΔFosB).

ΔFosB also plays an important role in regulating behavioral responses to natural rewards, such as palatable food, sex, and exercise. Natural rewards, like drugs of abuse, induce ΔFosB in the nucleus accumbens, and chronic acquisition of these rewards can result in a similar pathological addictive state. Thus, ΔFosB is also the key transcription factor involved in addictions to natural rewards as well, and sexual addictions in particular, since ΔFosB in the nucleus accumbens is critical for the reinforcing effects of sexual reward. Research on the interaction between natural and drug rewards suggests that psychostimulants and sexual reward possess cross-sensitization effects and act on common biomolecular mechanisms of addiction-related neuroplasticity which are mediated through ΔFosB.

Treatment

Counseling
As of 2023, none of the official regulatory bodies for Psycho-sexual Counseling or Sex and Relationship therapy, have accepted sex addiction as a distinct entity with associated treatment protocols. Indeed, some practitioners regard sex addiction as a potentially harmful diagnosis and draw parallels with gay conversion therapy. As a result, treatment for sex addiction is more often provided by addiction professionals in the counseling field than psychosexual specialists. These counseling professionals typically hold advanced degrees of education including master's degrees or Doctorates in counseling or a related field like psychology. These counselors can also hold certifications like Licensed Professional Counselors (LPC-S) who are required to hold a master's degree or higher level of education. Therapists and Psychologists usually also hold a Master's in a related field of study.

Cognitive behavioral therapy is a common form of behavioral treatment for addictions and maladaptive behaviors in general. Dialectical behavior therapy has been shown to improve treatment outcomes as well. Certified Sex Addiction Therapists (CSAT) a group of sexual addiction therapists certified by the International Institute for Trauma and Addiction Professionals offer specialized behavioral therapy designed specifically for sexual addiction. Their treatments have yet to be subject to peer-review, so it is unclear if they help or harm patients.

In-person support groups
In-person support groups are available in most of the developed world. None yet have any scientific evidence to show whether or not they are helpful, so attendees do so at their own risk.

The groups include:
 Sex Addicts Anonymous: For those who want to reduce or eliminate their use of pornography, masturbation, and/or unwanted sexual activity.
 Sex and Love Addicts Anonymous: Similar to the above.
 Sexaholics Anonymous: For those who want to eliminate their use of pornography, masturbation, unwanted sexual activity, and/or sex outside of marriage. Has a stricter definition of sexual sobriety than its competitors.
 SMART Recovery.

In places where none of the above are available, open meetings of Alcoholics Anonymous or Narcotics Anonymous may be a second-best option. At open AA and NA meetings, non-alcoholics/non-addicts are welcome to observe but not participate.

Support groups may be useful for uninsured or under-insured individuals. (See also: .) They may also be useful as an adjunct to professional treatment. In addition, they may be useful in places where professional practices are full (i.e. not accepting new patients), scarce, or nonexistent, or where these practices have waiting lists. Finally, they may be useful for patients who are reluctant to spend money on professional treatment.

Medications

Antiviral drugs

The term "pre-exposure prophylaxis" (PrEP) generally refers to the use of antiviral drugs to help prevent AIDS. PrEP is an optional treatment for people who are HIV-negative, but have a substantial risk of getting an HIV infection.

In the US, most insurance plans cover these drugs.

Epidemiology
According to a systematic review from 2014, observed prevalence rates of sexual addiction/hypersexual disorder range from 3% to 6%. Some studies suggest that sex addicts are disproportionately male, at 80%.

History
Sex addiction as a term first emerged in the mid-1970s when various members of Alcoholics Anonymous sought to apply the principles of 12-steps toward sexual recovery from serial infidelity and other unmanageable compulsive sex behaviors that were similar to the powerlessness and un-manageability they experienced with alcoholism. Multiple 12-step style self-help groups now exist for people who identify as sex addicts, including Sex Addicts Anonymous, Sexaholics Anonymous, Sex and Love Addicts Anonymous, and Sexual Compulsives Anonymous.

Society and culture

Controversy

The controversy surrounding sexual addiction is centered around its identification, through a diagnostic model, in a clinical setting. As noted in current medical literature reviews, compulsive sexual behavior has been observed in humans; drug-induced compulsive sexual behavior has also been noted clinically in some individuals taking dopaminergic drugs. Moreover, some research suggests compulsive engagement in sexual behavior despite negative consequences in animal models. Since current diagnostic models use drug-related concepts as diagnostic criteria for addictions, these are ill-suited for modelling compulsive behaviors in a clinical setting. Consequently, diagnostic classification systems, such as the DSM, do not include sexual addiction as a diagnosis because there is currently "insufficient peer-reviewed evidence to establish the diagnostic criteria and course descriptions needed to identify these behaviors as mental disorders". A systematic review on sexual addiction conducted in 2014 argued that the "lack of empirical evidence on sexual addiction is the result of the disease's complete absence from versions of the Diagnostic and Statistical Manual of Mental Disorders."

There have been debates regarding the definition and existence of sexual addictions for decades, as the issue was covered in a 1994 journal article. The Mayo Clinic considers sexual addiction a form of obsessive compulsive disorder and refer to it as "sexual compulsivity" (note that addiction has been defined as a compulsion toward rewarding stimuli, although the ASAM now describe it as "a primary, chronic disease of brain reward, motivation, memory and related circuitry.")). A paper dating back to 1988 and a journal comment letter published in 2006 asserted that sex addiction is itself a myth, a by-product of cultural and other influences. The 1988 paper argued that the condition is instead a way of projecting social stigma onto patients. "Love addiction" falls into the same controversial area as well since it refers to a frequent pattern of intimate relationships which can be a by product of cultural norms and commonly accepted morals.

In a report from 2003, Marty Klein, stated that "the concept of sex addiction provides an excellent example of a model that is both sex-negative and politically disastrous." Klein singled out a number of features that he considered crucial limitations of the sex addiction model and stated that the diagnostic criteria for sexual addiction are easy to find on the internet. Drawing on the Sexual Addiction Screening Test, he stated that "the sexual addiction diagnostic criteria make problems of nonproblematic experiences, and as a result pathologize a majority of people."

It has been argued that the CSBD diagnosis is not based upon sex research.

Popular culture

Sexual addiction has been the main theme in a variety of films including Diary of a Sex Addict, I Am a Sex Addict, Black Snake Moan, Confessions of a Porn Addict, Shame, Thanks for Sharing, Don Jon, and Choke.

See also

 Compulsive sexual behaviour disorder
 Compulsive masturbation
 Hypersexuality
 Internet sex addiction
 Pornography addiction
 Sexual obsessions

References

Further reading
Books that provide overview history and treatment techniques for sexual addiction include: Out of the Shadows: Understanding Sex Addiction by Patrick Carnes. (Hazelden, 1983) 
 Sex and Love Addicts Anonymous: The Basic Text for the Augustine Fellowship (Augustine Fellowship, 1986) 
 Sex Lies and Forgiveness: Couples Speaking Out on Healing from Sex Addiction by Jennifer P. Schneider and Burt Schneider. (Recovery Resources Press, 1991) 
 Don't Call It Love: Recovery From Sexual Addiction by Bantam, Patrick Carnes. (1992) 
 Sex Addiction: Case Studies And Management by Ralph H. Earle and Marcus R. Earle. (Brunner/Mazel, 1995) 
 Sexual Addiction: An Integrated Approach by Aviel Goodman. (International Universities Press, 1998) 
 Breaking the Cycle: Free Yourself from Sex Addiction, Porn Obsession, and Shame by George N. Collins, Andrew Adleman. (New Harbinger Publications, 2011) Books focusing on partners of sex addicts: My Secret Life with a Sex Addict from discovery to recovery by Emma Dawson. (Thornton Publishing, 2004) 
 Hope After Betrayal: Healing When Sexual Addiction Invades Your Marriage by Meg Wilson. (Kregel Publications, 2007) 
 Deceived: Facing Sexual Betrayal Lies and Secrets by Claudia Black.  (Hazelden, 2009) 
 Your Sexually Addicted Spouse: How Partners Can Cope and Heal by Barbara Steffens and Marsha Means. (New Horizon Press, 2009) 
 Mending a Shattered Heart: A Guide for Partners of Sex Addicts by Stefanie Carnes. (Gentle Path Press, 2011) 
 Love You, Hate the Porn: Healing a Relationship Damaged by Virtual Infidelity by Mark Chamberlain. (Shadow Mountain; 2 July 2011 edition, 2011) 
 A Couple's Guide to Sexual Addiction: A Step-by-Step Plan to Rebuild Trust and Restore Intimacy by Paldrom Collins and George Collins. (Adams Media, 2011) 
 Facing Heartbreak: Steps to Recovery for Partners of Sex Addicts by Stefanie Carnes. (Gentle Path Press, 2012) Discussions of the concept of sexual addiction:'''
 
 

 
Paraphilias
Sexual health
Behavioral addiction